Brother, Bring the Sun is the first studio album released by singer-songwriter Dave Barnes. It was produced by Ed Cash.

Track listing

Album credits 

Performance
Dave Barnes Acoustic Guitar
 Drums
 Background Vocals
Jackie Street Bass
Scott Williamson Drums
Chris Kent Bass
Dan Needham Drums
Ed Cash Organ
 Acoustic Guitar
 Electric Guitar
 Kazoo
 Background Vocals
 Classical Guitar
Matt Pierson Bass
Calvin Turner Bass
 Background Vocals
Ben Shive Piano
 Fender Rhodes
 Wurlitzer

Technical
Ed Cash Producer
 Engineer
Richard Dodd Mastering
Jeremy Cowart Art Direction
Dave Barnes Drawing
Handwriting
Amy Young Assistant Photographer
Darci Stebbins Assistant Photographer

External links 
 DaveBarnes.com
 Technical and release info from Barnes & Noble

Dave Barnes albums
2004 albums